Elachista semophanta is a moth of the family Elachistidae that is endemic to Malawi.

References

semophanta
Moths described in 1914
Moths of Africa
Endemic fauna of Malawi